The plant genus Cyanus is nowadays included in Centaurea.

Cyanus is a genus of flies in the family Calliphoridae.

Species
C. elongatus (Hough, 1898)

References

Calliphoridae
Oestroidea genera